Peter Philipp (16 July 1971 – 6 February 2014) was a German writer and comedian.

Life and work 
Peter Philipp was born in 1971 in Düsseldorf in Northrhine-Westphalia. There he studied from 1992 to 2000 German literature and philosophy at the Heinrich-Heine-Universität Düsseldorf. He published several books and founded the cabaret vocal ensemble Waschkraft, as its chief songwriter, bassist, singer and master of ceremonies, he served since 2000.

In 1998, the book Logisch-philosophische Untersuchungen was published by Walter de Gruyter. In 2000 Philipp published his first poetry book (Grupello publisher in Düsseldorf). In 2003, the book of poems Die Flötentöne was published. In 2004 he received the Förderpreis für Literatur der Landeshauptstadt Düsseldorf in Northrhine-Westphalia.

Philip lived as a freelance writer in Düsseldorf and wrote poetry and prose. He died on 6 February 2014 at the age of 42 in his home town of Düsseldorf.

Awards 
 2004: Förderpreis für Literatur der Landeshauptstadt Düsseldorf
 2006: 6. Schwelmer Kleinkunstpreis
 2006: RP-Kleinkunstpreis „Goldener Xaver“
 2007: Kleinkunstpreis „St. Ingberter Pfanne“
 2008: Herborner Schlumpeweck
 2009: Kleinkunstpreis der Eifel-Kulturtage „Goldene Berta 2009“

Publications

Books 
 “Fatimas Träume: Deutsche-Welle-Literaturwettbewerb für die arabischsprachige Welt”, Berlin 1994 (als Herausgeber zusammen mit George Khoury)
 “Logisch-philosophische Untersuchungen”, Berlin 1998
 “Kleine Automatenhunde”, Gedichte, Grupello-Verlag, Düsseldorf, 2000
 “Die Flötentöne - Ein Lehrgang in 12 Schritten”, Gedichte, Grupello-Verlag, Düsseldorf, 2003

Contributions in Anthologies 
 “John Linthicum zugewandt” Grupello-Verlag, Düsseldorf, 2003
 “Nix verraten dich, Grupello!”, Eine Festschrift, Grupello-Verlag, Düsseldorf, 2005
 “M8worte”, mit Autorengruppe M8worte, 2005
 “Feinschmecker und Zeitschmecker”, mit Autorengruppe M8worte, 2006

Discography 
 2003: „Waschblatt“, CD
 2008: „Cocktail Scheisse Katze“, CD
 2009: „Feine Stücke“, CD

References

External links 
 
 Portrait of Peter Philipp
 Peter Philipp in Waschkraft

1971 births
2014 deaths
Writers from Düsseldorf
People from the Rhine Province
German male comedians
21st-century German poets
21st-century German male writers
Heinrich Heine University Düsseldorf alumni
German male poets
20th-century German poets
20th-century German male writers